The West Yorkshire Association Football League is a football competition based in Yorkshire, England. It was previously known as the Leeds League until the name change in 1939. Although it is named the West Yorkshire League, clubs from the Harrogate and York areas of North Yorkshire also play in the competition.

Currently the league has three senior team divisions, and two for reserves. Officially part of the National League System, the Premier Division is a step 7 (or level 11) league in the pyramid. Clubs are able to be promoted to the Northern Counties East Football League or the North West Counties Football League; Knaresborough Town in 2012 were accepted by the Northern Counties East League and Shelley Community were accepted by the North West Counties League in 2018.

Some other teams who once played in the West Yorkshire League but now play their football at higher levels of the pyramid include AFC Emley, Harrogate Town, Harrogate Railway Athletic, Ossett Town (now merged with Ossett Albion to form Ossett United), Thackley and Garforth Town.

Champions
An incomplete list of West Yorkshire League top division winners.

Member clubs 2022-23 season

Premier Division
Beeston St Anthony
Carlton Athletic
Gomersal & Cleckheaton
Hall Green United
Headingley
Horsforth St. Margarets
Huddersfield Amateur
Hunslet
Kirk Deighton Rangers
Knaresborough Town
Otley Town
Poole
Rawdon Old Boys
Robin Hood Athletic
Shelley
Silsden AFC WY

Division One
Aberford Albion | Altofts | Boroughbridge | East End Park | Featherstone Colliery | Field | Harrogate Railway Athletic | Ilkley Town | Old Centralians | Oxenhope Recreation | Swillington Saints Welfare | Wetherby Athletic | Whitkirk Wanderers | Wyke Wanderers

Division Two
Beeston St Anthony Reserves | Horbury Town | Howden Clough | Huddersfield LH | Kellingley Welfare | Leeds Modernians | Overthorpe Sports Club | Ripon City | Rothwell | Salts | Sherburn White Rose | Thackley | Tingley Athletic

References

External links
West Yorkshire League tables FA Full-Time
Old Centralians AFC Official Website 

 
Football in West Yorkshire
1928 establishments in England
Football leagues in England
Sports leagues established in 1928
Amateur association football
Football competitions in Yorkshire